Potterton is a village north of Aberdeen, Scotland, in Aberdeenshire, west of Balmedie. Population in 1991 was 1159, falling by 2001 to 886.

References

Villages in Aberdeenshire